Battle of Massawa may refer to:

 Battle of Massawa (1977)
 Battle of Massawa (1990)